The 1875 Princeton Tigers football team represented the College of New Jersey, then more commonly known as Princeton College, in the 1875 college football season. The team finished with a 2–0 record. Collins Denny, who later became a notable clergyman and professor of philosophy, was captain of the 1875 team.

On November 13, Princeton defeated Columbia by a 6–2 score. The New York Herald wrote: "The contest was short, sharp and decisive and attracted a considerable crowd."

The team was retroactively named national champion by the Billingsley Report and as co-national champion (along with Harvard and Columbia) by Parke H. Davis.

This season marked the last of four consecutive national championships, and one of 11 in a 13-year period between 1869 and 1881.

Schedule

Standings

References

Princeton
Princeton Tigers football seasons
College football national champions
College football undefeated seasons
Princeton Tigers football